Ernest John Plantagenet Cassan (17 October 1835 – 24 December 1904) was an English first-class cricketer.

The son of Stephen Hyde Cassan, he was born in October 1835 at Bruton, Somerset where he attended King's School. From there he went up to Magdalen College, Oxford. While studying at Oxford, he made two appearances in first-class cricket for Oxford University in 1859, against the Marylebone Cricket Club at Oxford and Cambridge University in The University Match at Lord's. He fared well with the ball in these matches, taking 16 wickets at an average of 11.00, with one five wicket haul of 5 for 64 against Cambridge. His endeavours earned him a cricket blue.

After graduating from Oxford, Cassan trained to become a barrister, though he never practiced due to his cricketing commitments. He was strongly associated with cricket in the West Country, where he played as an amateur for Dorset, Incogniti, Lansdown, and the Gentlemen of Somerset. He founded the latter with fellow West Country cricket enthusiasts in 1860, with the team later evolving into Somerset County Cricket Club in 1875. Away from his cricketing commitments, he served as a governor for King's School, Bruton from 1876–8. Cassan committed suicide by shooting himself in the head on Christmas Eve in 1904.

References

External links

1835 births
1904 suicides
People from Bruton
People educated at King's School, Bruton
Alumni of Magdalen College, Oxford
English cricketers
Oxford University cricketers
English barristers
Suicides by firearm in England
19th-century English lawyers